No Room to Run is a 1977 Australian television film about an American businessman who kills a man in Sydney. The lead actors, writer, producer and director were all American. It stars real-life husband and wife Richard Benjamin and Paula Prentiss.

It was the first in a series of six TV movies made as co productions between the ABC and Los Angeles-based Transatlantic Enterprises.

Plot
Nick Loomis is vice-president in charge of public relations with an international corporation. He travels to Australia to promote the American Youth Orchestra who are performing at the Sydney Opera House. His boss, Garth Kingswood plans to follow
within a few days.

Loomis is met at the airport by his company's Sydney representative, Ralph Fleming. Fleming tells him about the mysterious death of employee Jack Deakin.

Loomis finds himself on the run for murder.

Cast
 Richard Benjamin as Nick Loomis
 Paula Prentiss as Terry McKenna
 Barry Sullivan as Garth Kingwood
 Ray Barrett as Jack Deakin
 Anne Haddy as Julie Deakin

Transatlantic Enterprises
The ABC's Controller of Television, John Cameron, was interested in getting the ABC involved in international co productions, to maximise the ABC's drama budget and to increase the chance of overseas sales. Through Global Television, the ABC's distribution in London, they got in contact with 20th Century Fox who agreed to handle US sales for the ABC-BBC show Ben Hall. Fox's representative, Robert Kline, suggested remaking Adventures in Paradise on location and in colour but Cameron felt the islands were too far from Australia. Cameron suggested a series set in the Gulf of Carpentaria and Klein agreed.

Klein ended up going into business on his own as Transatlantic Enterprises, and it was that company which went into partnership with the ABC.

So they decided to make a series of TV movies instead. Originally it was six, then grew to 18 over three years. The films were to have budgets of $1.5 to 2 million and would be screened on ABC television with the option of a theatrical release elsewhere.

Robert Kline, head of Trans Atlantic, said "basically we'll be dealing with creative dimensions that justify American leads being in Australia... Sydney is comparable to Southern California. In those cases where we don't develop a story from scratch, we're finding that scripts calling from California settings can be adapted to Australia.

John Cameron said "Nobody ought   to believe that   this is   going   to   result   in   the   finest flower   of television   drama. It   will   be high   action,   adventure-orientated,   the sort of material that   is   staple   diet   for  prime-time   viewing   all   over the world. Not   too   banal   or   stupid,   but   nonetheless lightweight   for   relaxed   viewing.” 

The Australian Writers Guild was placated with the assurance that half the scripts would be written by Australians at the same rate as American writers. The Producers and Directors Guild were assured that Australians would be hired to assist and observe American directors on the initial productions and then be used to direct later ones. Actors Equity allowed two imported actors per film. The scripts were supervised by James Davern, the ABC's head of drama, and Gene Levitt, and American writer-producer-director.

Production

Development
The first of the movies was No Room to Run which was originally called Hunted.

The head of TransAtlantic wanted Rita Lakin to write a pilot called The Last Bride of Salem. She agreed provided he give her husband, Robert Michael Lewis, the job of directing one of the Australian films.

The stars were Richard Benjamin and Paula Prentiss, who were married in real life. They accepted the parts because it gave them a chance to visit Sydney, and because the film was a thriller, and both were better known for comedy . "I haven't played a serious role like this before, I'm always comedy oriented," said Prentiss.

They had acted together in the TV show He and She and on stage in The Norman Conquests, but had never previously appeared in a film together where they shared screen time (they were both in Catch 22 but did not appear in the same scenes).

Benjamin and Prentiss arrived in Sydney on September 8 and filming started September 14.

Filming
Lewis says Lakin came to Australia to work on the script with George Kirgo and Joe Gantman "but we never fundamentally solved the problems. I mean, it was okay but it wasn't breathtaking."

Filming took place in and around Sydney Harbour and the Rocks. Prentiss and Benjamin enjoyed the shoot in part because they so rarely acted together on film.

Lewis says "the film industry was very primitive" in Australia - he was happy with the cinematographer and camera operator but felt the grips, gaffers and electricians were too inexperienced and the stuntmen were "too careless" and almost caused someone to be injured. "The whole set up was poor," says Lewis.

During filming Lewis fell in love with the woman who was Paula Prentiss' stand in and married her.

Noel Ferrier said "my own estimation of my performance was dreadful... in fairness, it has to be said the whole film was on a par with my contribution in it." He says Prentiss and Benjamin were "charming" but "were both taking fluid pills to preserve their match like slenderness and consequently were forever rushing to the lavatory."

Reception
The Sydney Morning Herald TV critic wrote that the film had a "confused plot, badly written script, some appalling miscasting — they all help to dispel the current feeling that maybe, at last Australian films and television have come of age. No Room To Run could have been thrown together 20 years ago, that's how amateurish it is."

The Australian Woman's Weekly wrote "the script... is below average and the production... worse."

Lewis said "the Australian reviews were awful. We re-adjusted Sydney in terms of where things were and literal Australian reviewers couldn't stand that."

Awards
Brian May won a Penguin Award for Best Original Music for the film.

Other Transatlantic films
Transatlantic wound up making six telemovies in Australia, not 18 as originally announced. The other ones produced were:
Barnaby and Me
Because He's My Friend
Puzzle
She'll Be Sweet
Shimmering Light

References

External links
No Room to Run at IMDb
No Room to Run at BFI
No Room to Run at Peter Malone website

Australian television films
1976 films
Australian action adventure films
Adventure television films
Action television films
1970s English-language films
Films directed by Robert Michael Lewis